Ashford is an inner southwestern suburb of Adelaide, in the City of West Torrens.  It is triangular in shape and bordered by South Road (west), Anzac Highway (southeast) and Everard Avenue (north). Two of the main features of the suburb are Ashford Hospital and Ashford Special School.

Brownhill Creek flows through Ashford in a cement channel behind the school.

The name commemorates the property and residence (now part of Ashford Special School) of Dr. Charles George Everard, who settled in the area in 1838, and named it for Ashford in Kent.

Notable people
Notable people from Ashford:
Victoria Balomenos (born 1988), soccer player
Nick J. Benton (born 1991), cricketer
Simon Birmingham (born 1974), politician
Craig Bradley (born 1963), baseballer
Emma Checker (born 1996), soccer player
Leanne Choo (born 1991), badminton
Louis D'Arrigo (born 2001), footballer
Harry Nielsen (born 1995), cricketer
Morgan Yaeger (born 1998), basketballer

References

Suburbs of Adelaide